The Ford Individual is a vehicle personalisation pack, introduced by Ford of Europe. It allows customers to personalise their new cars by selecting from a range of features and equipment that supplement standard trim levels.

The Ford Individual option packs have so far been revealed for the Ka, Fiesta, Kuga, Mondeo, S-MAX and Galaxy ranges to offer customers something extra – detail touches that supposedly create an air of luxury and craftsmanship. At the Geneva Motor Show 2009, this is extended to the company's best-selling model in Europe, the Focus.

The Ford Individual includes these features in addition:
Ford Individual Interior Styling Pack
Ford Individual Exterior Styling Pack

Examples

External links
Ford S-MAX Ford Individual
Ford Galaxy Ford Individual

References

Ford Motor Company